Dehradun international film festival is a film festival, inaugurated in 2015, based in Dehradun and Uttarakhand and headquartered in New Delhi, India.

This festival is organized and filmmakers and other important personalities are invited. Awards are given in various cinema sectors, including regional cinemas.

In 2017, film director Subhash Ghai inaugurated the 3rd Dehradun International Film Festival.

During the Dehradun International Film Festival 2021, Uttarakhand Chief Minister Pushkar Singh Dhami presented the "Most Promising Actor" award to Aditya Seal.

References 

Film festivals in India